Niklas Olsson (born 7 December 1983), better known as Niklas Kvarforth, is a Swedish singer and songwriter. He is the founder, composer, and vocalist of the black metal band Shining.

Background
As a multi-instrumentalist musician, Kvarforth started Shining when he was only 12 years old, in 1996. The band released their first EP, Submit to Selfdestruction, two years later, on which he played guitars and bass. It was not until the band released their first album, Within Deep Dark Chambers, that Kvarforth became the band's vocalist.

Controversies 
Kvarforth is known in the scene for his extreme and sometimes violent behaviour during live performances, including fighting members of other bands, and handing out razor blades to audience members in 2007. Kvarforth has also been accused of assaulting and threatening audience members in 2017.

Kvarforth has also performed auto-mutilations onstage and seems to encourage the practice. He often states in interviews that he hates "everything that grows". It is unclear if his statements made to journalists are in earnest or simply to mock them. Many fans believe he generally holds journalists and reporters in contempt, and purposely mocks them. Kvarforth himself has neither affirmed nor denied this publicly, but consistently expresses his hatred of other people, himself, various countries, and life itself.

Discography

With Shining  
 Within Deep Dark Chambers (2000)
 Livets ändhållplats (2001) 
 III: Angst, självdestruktivitetens emissarie (2002)
 IV: The Eerie Cold (2005) 
 V: Halmstad (2007)
 VI: Klagopsalmer (2009)
 VII: Född förlorare (2011)
 Redefining Darkness (2012)
 IX: Everyone, Everything, Everywhere, Ends (2015)
  X: Varg Utan Flock (2018)

With Skitliv 
 Amfetamin (MCD) (2008)
 Skandinavisk Misantropi (2009)

With Diabolicum 
 Hail Terror (2005)

With Den Saakaldte 
 Øl, mørke og depresjon (2008)
 All Hail Pessimism (2009)

With Funeral Dirge 
 The Silence Ebony (1999)

With Bethlehem 
 A Sacrificial Offering to the Kingdom of Heaven in a Cracked Dog's Ear (2009)
 Stönkfitzchen (2010)

With Manes 
 Solve et Coagula (2009)

With The Sarcophagus 
 Towards the Eternal Chaos (2009)

With Anaal Nathrakh 
 Desideratum (2014)

With The Vision Bleak
 Set Sail to Mystery (2010)

With Behemoth
 A Forest (2020)

References

Living people
Swedish heavy metal singers
1983 births
Swedish expatriates in Norway
Swedish expatriates in Finland
Singers from Halmstad
Songwriters from Halmstad
21st-century Swedish singers